Ricardo J. Torres Martinez (April 16, 1891 – April 17, 1960) was a professional baseball catcher and first baseman in the Cuban League, Negro league baseball, and Major League Baseball (MLB).

In 22 games over three major league seasons, Torres posted a .297 batting average (11-for-37) with nine runs and three runs batted in. He recorded a .983 fielding percentage playing nine games at catcher and seven games at first base.

Torres was the father of Gil Torres.

External links
 and Seamheads

1891 births
1960 deaths
Major League Baseball catchers
Major League Baseball first basemen
Major League Baseball players from Cuba
Cuban expatriate baseball players in the United States
Habana players
Long Branch Cubans players
Orientals players
Washington Senators (1901–1960) players
Shreveport Gassers players
Tampa Smokers players
Meridian Mets players
Baseball players from Havana